Layyah , is a tehsil located in Layyah District, Punjab, Pakistan. It is administratively subdivided into 23 Union Councils, three of which form the tehsil and district capital Layyah.

History
The tehsil was created during the period of British rule, the population according to the 1891 census was 113,451, this had risen to 122,578 in 1901. At this time the tehsil was part of Mianwali District, at the time of the 1901 census it contained 2 towns - the capital Layyah (population 7,546) and Karor Lal Isa (population 3,243) as well as 118 villages. The land revenue and cesses in 1903-4 amounted to 1.6 lakhs. The tehsil was divided into the Thal and the Kacchi, the former a high sandy tract to the east and the latter a low-lying strip of country along the Indus. The tehsil was subsequently divided and Karor Tehsil now exists as a separate tehsil.

References

Layyah District
Tehsils of Punjab, Pakistan